Stephen Foster (1826–1864), known as "the father of American music", was an American songwriter.

Stephen Foster may also refer to:
 Stephen Foster (Lord Mayor of London)  (fl. 1454), fishmonger and Lord Mayor of London
 Stephen Clark Foster (Maine politician) (1799–1872), United States Representative from Maine
 Stephen Symonds Foster (1809–1881), American abolitionist and social activist 
 Stephen Clark Foster (1822–1898), mayor of Los Angeles
 C. Stephen Foster (fl. 1965), American ophthalmologist
 Steve Foster (singer) (1946–2018), Australian singer-songwriter
 Stephen Foster (cricketer) (born 1968), English cricketer
 Stephen Foster (footballer) (born 1980), English footballer
 Stephen Foster (boxer) (born 1980), English boxer of the 2000s and 2010s
 Stephen Foster (triathlete) (born 1966), Australian professional triathlete; see ITU World Triathlon Series

Other uses
Bing Crosby – Stephen Foster, a 1946 album of songs written by Foster and sung by Crosby
Stephen Foster (sculpture), a 1900 public statue in Pittsburgh
Stephen Foster - The Musical

See also
Stephen Foster Briggs (1885–1976), American engineer
Stephen Foster Folk Culture Center State Park, Florida
Stephen Foster Handicap, an American horse race
Stephen Foster House or S. A. Foster House and Stable, Chicago, Illinois
Stephen Foster House (Topsfield, Massachusetts)
Stephen Foster Memorial, a historical landmark in Pittsburgh
Stephen C. Foster State Park, a park in the Okefenokee Swamp, Georgia
Steve Foster (disambiguation)

Foster, Stephen